Paul Stephen Andrew Lamek was a lawyer and Justice of the Ontario Superior Court of Justice.

Education
Lamek studied law at the University of Oxford and began teaching law at the University of Pennsylvania, then taught at Osgoode Hall Law School from 1962 through 1967.

Legal career
Lamek was the 53rd Treasurer of the Law Society of Upper Canada, serving from 1993 to 1995.

Judicial career
He was appointed a Justice of the Superior Court in Ontario in 1999.

Personal life
Born December 14, 1936 in England and died August 29, 2001 aged 64 in Toronto Canada.
Lamek had lost a leg to diabetes. He was friends with lawyers Edward Greenspan and Harvey Thomas Strosberg who delivered his eulogy at the Cathedral Church of St. James (Toronto).

References

Treasurers of the Law Society of Upper Canada
2002 deaths
Year of birth missing
Judges in Ontario